The Beehive is a Grade II listed public house at 126 Crawford Street, London.

It was first licensed in 1793 before being rebuilt in 1884. The contemporary pub has a floorspace of 1,700 sq ft.

References

External links 

Grade II listed pubs in the City of Westminster
Buildings and structures in Marylebone